Anthony James (born 9 October 1978) is a Welsh former footballer who last played as a centre-back for English club Hereford.

Career
Born in Cwmbran, James started his professional career at West Bromwich Albion where he played in the reserves. He then moved to Hereford United.

He soon established himself as a first choice centre back, partnering Hereford captain Ian Wright. He was voted Player of the Year for the 2002–03 and 2003–04 seasons, in the latter he was an ever-present. When Wright left the club in 2003, James took over the captaincy and led the club to runner-up spot in the Conference in three successive seasons. He was also the regular penalty taker for Hereford, his most notable penalty being the opening goal in the televised 9–0 win over Dagenham & Redbridge in 2004.

In the first half of the 2000s he was widely regarded as one of the highest performing central defenders in the Conference, with Peter Shreeves stating that he was the best defender in the Conference. James also represented his country at semi-pro international level.

By 2006 injuries had cost him his first team place to Dean Beckwith and James did not play a part in the last nine games of the season, including the play-off final which saw Hereford win promotion to the Football League. His significant contribution to the club was recognised when he was invited onto the rostrum to lift the trophy with team captain Tamika Mkandawire. He holds the record for the most Conference appearances by a Hereford United player and is ranked 18th on Hereford's all-time list of most appearances with 322 (20 goals).

James moved to Weymouth where he was to spend just one season at the promotion-chasing outfit, captaining the club and scoring three penalties. When financial troubles hit the Terras, James moved to Burton Albion for the current season. A knee injury sustained at the start of the season limited his appearances but he returned to first team action against Altrincham. He was part of the 2008–09 Conference National winning side and signed a new contract with Burton in May 2009. James rejoined Hereford United on a month's loan in October 2010.

James was released by Burton at the end of the 2011–12 season and in June 2012 he signed for Conference National team Newport County. In the 2012–13 season he was part of the Newport team that finished 3rd in the league, reaching the Conference National playoffs. Newport County won the playoff final versus Wrexham at Wembley Stadium 2–0 to return to the Football League after a 25-year absence with promotion to Football League Two.

James retired from playing in May 2014 and was appointed strength and conditioning coach at Newport County.

On 2 June 2015, it was confirmed that James had agreed terms with the phoenix club, Hereford FC.

Personal
Tony James is the father of professional footballer Jordan James.

Honours
Hereford United
Conference National play-offs: 2005–06

Burton Albion
Conference National: 2008–09

Newport County
Conference National play-off winners: 2012–13

References

External links
Burton Albion Squad Profile

1978 births
Living people
Welsh footballers
West Bromwich Albion F.C. players
Hereford United F.C. players
Weymouth F.C. players
Burton Albion F.C. players
Newport County A.F.C. players
Sportspeople from Abergavenny
English Football League players
National League (English football) players
Association football central defenders